Christopher Greenup (c. 1750 – April 27, 1818) was an American politician who served as a U.S. Representative and the third Governor of Kentucky. Little is known about his early life; the first reliable records about him are documents recording his service in the Revolutionary War where he served as a lieutenant in the Continental Army and a colonel in the Virginia militia.

After his service in the war, Greenup helped settle the trans-Appalachian regions of Virginia. He became involved in politics, and played an active role in three of the ten statehood conventions that secured the separation of Kentucky from Virginia in 1792. He became one of the state's first representatives, and served in the Kentucky General Assembly before being elected governor in a race where, due to his immense popularity, he ran unopposed.

Greenup's term in office was marred by accusations that he had participated in the Burr Conspiracy to align Kentucky with Spain prior to the former's separation from Virginia, but he vigorously and successfully rebutted these charges. Following his term as governor, he became less active in the political arena. He died on April 27, 1818. Greenup County, Kentucky and its county seat were both named in his honor.

Early life in Virginia
Christopher Greenup was most likely born in Fairfax County in the Virginia Colony around 1750. His parents were John and Elizabeth (Witten) Greenup. His early education was attained at the local schools of the area. He learned surveying and studied law under Colonel Charles Binns at Charles City County, Virginia. During the American Revolutionary War, he served in Grayson's Additional Continental Regiment as a lieutenant, and may have seen action at Brandywine and Germantown. He resigned his commission during the Valley Forge encampment in 1778, but later served as a colonel in the Virginia militia.

In 1781, Greenup helped settle the area now known as Lincoln County, Kentucky where he spent time as a surveyor and a land speculator. He was admitted to practice law in the county court in 1782. Following Virginia's creation of Kentucky County in 1783, he was admitted to the bar of the district court of Harrodsburg and served as clerk from 1785 to 1792. In 1783, he became one of the original trustees of Transylvania Seminary (later to become Transylvania University.) He purchased two lots of land in Lexington and served as the clerk of the town's trustees.

In 1785, Greenup was elected to represent Fayette County for a single term in the Virginia House of Delegates. During his service, he was appointed to a committee with Benjamin Logan and James Garrard to make recommendations on ways to further divide the area that would become Kentucky. The committee was also responsible for revising acts and surveys related to land and water surveys in the area. The committee ultimately recommended the creation of three new counties – Bourbon, Madison, and Mercer. When Mercer County was created later that year, Greenup was appointed a justice there. In 1786, Greenup served as a quartermaster in Benjamin Logan’s expedition against the Shawnees in the Ohio country.

During this time, Greenup continued to practice law in Fayette County and pursued various other interests. He was a founding member of the Danville Political Club and in 1787, he joined the Kentucky Society for Promoting Useful Knowledge. Future Kentucky Governors Isaac Shelby and James Garrard, as well as future Supreme Court justice Thomas Todd were also members of the Society. In 1789, he helped organize the Kentucky Manufacturing Society. Later, he was appointed to the Kentucky River Company, a group dedicated to improving infrastructure on the Kentucky River.

On July 9, 1787, during a brief return to Virginia, Greenup married Mary Catherine ("Cathy") Pope of Hanover County, Virginia; the couple had two children – Nancy and William.

Political career in Kentucky
Greenup served as clerk of the first Kentucky statehood convention in Danville in 1784. He was elected as a delegate to the second and sixth statehood conventions in 1785 and 1788, respectively, and was a trustee of the city of Danville in 1787. H.E. Everman, biographer of fellow delegate James Garrard, noted that despite Greenup's excellent legal background and legislative experience, his lack of oratorical skills prevented him from taking more of a leadership role in the conventions.

When Kentucky was admitted to the Union in 1792, Greenup moved to Frankfort where he was rewarded for his efforts on behalf of the state by being chosen as an elector for the state's senators and governor. He also served in the first Kentucky Senate. Following this, he was appointed to the court of oyer and terminer, but resigned immediately to accept a seat in the U.S. House of Representatives. He was one of Kentucky's first two representatives in the House, and was elected to three successive terms, serving from November 9, 1792 to March 3, 1797. In 1798, he was elected to the Kentucky House of Representatives, representing Mercer County. He also served as clerk of the state senate from 1799 to 1802.

Greenup was a candidate for governor of Kentucky in 1800, but was runner-up to James Garrard in a four-man race that also included Benjamin Logan and Thomas Todd. Greenup garnered a majority of the vote in fifteen counties, just one fewer than Garrard, but Garrard enjoyed strong support in the populous central Kentucky counties and received 8,390 votes, compared with 6,746 for Greenup, 3,996 for Logan, and 2,166 for Todd. Garrard appointed Greenup judge of the circuit court in 1802. After the Kentucky Senate refused to confirm Garrard's Secretary of State, Harry Toulmin, as registrar of the land office, Garrard nominated Greenup. Greenup, however, intended to make another run at the governorship, and at his request, Garrard withdrew the nomination days later.

Greenup resigned his circuit judgeship on June 5, 1804, to make another run for governor. Immensely popular, he ran unopposed, and served as governor from September 4, 1804 to September 1, 1808. During Greenup's administration, the state chartered the Bank of Kentucky and the Ohio Canal Company; Greenup became a director of the former in 1807. Despite his popularity, however, he was unable to pass much of his proposed agenda, which included provision of public education and reforms to the militia, courts, revenue system, and penal system.

A partisan Frankfort newspaper implicated Greenup in the Burr conspiracy, but he successfully defended himself and preserved his reputation. He deployed the Kentucky militia along the Ohio River to defend the state from any threat that might result from the Burr conspiracy, but that threat had largely dissipated by 1807.

Following his term as governor, Greenup was chosen as a presidential elector for the ticket of James Madison and George Clinton. In 1812, he became a justice of the peace in Franklin County. In August 1812, Kentucky Secretary of State Martin D. Hardin recommended to Governor Isaac Shelby that Greenup be appointed Assistant Secretary of State. Shelby made the appointment, and when Hardin, resigned December 15, 1812, Shelby nominated Greenup as his replacement. The Kentucky Senate approved the nomination on February 3, 1813, and Greenup served until his resignation on March 13, 1813.

Personal life and death
On October 22, 1807, Greenup's wife Mary died in the Governor's Mansion. According to legend, her ghostly image has appeared in clock faces and mirrors inside the mansion.

Greenup died April 27, 1818, at Blue Lick Springs Resort, where he had traveled seeking relief from his rheumatism. He is buried in the Frankfort Cemetery. Greenup County, Kentucky was named in his honor, as was its county seat of Greenup, Kentucky.

See also

Footnotes

References

Bibliography

Ward, Harry M. "Greenup, Christopher" (1750-1818), governor and congressman. American National Biography. Retrieved 24 Oct. 2021.

Further reading

External links

Christopher Greenup at The Political Graveyard
Service record from Francis B. Heitman's Historical Register of Officers of the Continental Army

1750 births
1818 deaths
Burials at Frankfort Cemetery
Continental Army officers from Virginia
Governors of Kentucky
Members of the Virginia House of Delegates
Members of the Kentucky House of Representatives
Politicians from Danville, Kentucky
People from Loudoun County, Virginia
Secretaries of State of Kentucky
Virginia militiamen in the American Revolution
Democratic-Republican Party members of the United States House of Representatives from Kentucky
Democratic-Republican Party state governors of the United States
People from Fairfax County, Virginia
18th-century American politicians
19th-century American politicians